Lost in Time is the fifth studio album by American R&B recording artist Eric Benét, released November 30, 2010 on Reprise Records. It is the follow-up to Love & Life (2008). Production for the album took place during 2010 at various recording studios and was handled by Benét, George Nash, Jr., and Demonté Posey. Lost in Time contains musical elements of 1970s soul music and features guest appearances by Chrisette Michele, Faith Evans, Eddie Levert, Ledisi, and Benét's daughter, India.

The album debuted at number 33 on the US Billboard 200 chart, selling 32,200 copies in its first week. Its first single "Sometimes I Cry" became an Urban AC hit and peaked at number 16 on the US Billboard Hot R&B/Hip-Hop Songs chart. Upon its release, Lost in Time received positive reviews from music critics. Benét promoted the album with a supporting tour that spanned November to December 2010.

Background and recording 
The album is the follow-up to Benét's fourth studio album, Love & Life (2008). Recording sessions took place during 2010 at various recording locations, including Big City Recording in Granada Hills, California, La Casa De Benét Studio and Studio City Sound in Studio City, California, Tanner-Monagle and The Laboratory Recording Studio in Milwaukee, Wisconsin, and The Palms Studio in Las Vegas, Nevada. Benét produced the album with songwriter Demonté Posey and longtime creative partner George Nash, Jr., Benét's cousin. He returned to his hometown Milwaukee and recorded with local musicians for the album, including the string section of the Milwaukee Symphony Orchestra. Benét also recorded duets for the album with R&B recording acts Faith Evans, Chrisette Michele, Ledisi, and Eddie Levert. The album was engineered and mixed by Kevin Sucher.

Composition 

Lost in Time incorporates elements of 1970s soul music. For the album, Benét sought to expand on the classicist soul style of his previous album's title track, "Love & Life", and produce an album-length homage to 1970s-era R&B. Benét said of the album's style in a press release, "People just need to have some feel good R&B in their lives. I want people to remember what music can feel like, and that desire took me all the way back to that time. My development as an artist is a direct result of being immersed in that era [...] When it comes to something that resonates in your soul, you have to have something constructed with live musicians". Prior to recording, he researched articles and documentaries about audio recording in that time period. In an interview for Blues & Soul, he discussed recording live in order to authenticate such a sound, stating

Release and promotion 
The album was released by Reprise Records on November 30, 2010. Its first single "Sometimes I Cry" was released on August 2, 2010 and became a number-one hit on the Urban AC chart. It peaked at number 16 in November and ultimately spent five weeks on the US Billboard Hot R&B/Hip-Hop Songs chart. It also charted at number 73 on the Billboard Hot 100 Airplay. Benét has said of the song, "[It] is about how you've completely moved on but still there's still some melancholy about the break-up. Maybe you're even dating somebody, but sometimes, when you're alone, you're sad about what could have been". "Never Want to Live Without You" was released as the album's second single on November 1. It charted at number 75 on the Billboard Hot R&B/Hip-Hop Songs. In promotion of Lost in Time, Benét is performing on a two-month-long, nationwide tour with R&B recording artist Fantasia. The tour spans November and December, concluding with December 31, 2010 and January 1, 2011 concert dates at the Fox Theatre in St. Louis, Missouri.

Reception 
Lost in Time debuted at number 33 on the US Billboard 200 chart, with first-week sales of 32,200 copies in the United States. It also entered at number eight on Billboards Top R&B/Hip-Hop Albums chart.

The album received positive reviews from contemporary music critics. Allmusic editor Stephen Thomas Erlewine gave it three-and-a-half out of five stars and observed a "seductive pastiche" on "the kind of record that might not be deep but shimmers pleasingly on the surface". Billboards Gail Mitchell called it a "spirited nod to the '70s soul/funk that has influenced [Benét's] career". Jon Caramanica of The New York Times felt that Benét's voice is "more flexible than ever" and called him "an able and sometimes ardent mimic to boot, not just of Maxwell’s tender histrionics but of several other styles". Milwaukee Journal Sentinel writer Jon M. Gilbertson complimented Benét's musical influences and smooth soul style. USA Todays Steve Jones gave the album three out of four stars and praised his "sensual and sophisticated balladry" on the album. Mikael Wood of The Village Voice called it a "crafty album" and wrote that Benét "expertly channels the plush balladry of mid-’80s Luther Vandross ('Never Live Without You'), the propulsive zing of early-’70s Philly soul ('Paid,' featuring Eddie Levert himself), and the frantic cheer of last-days disco ('Good Life')".

Track listing

Personnel 
Credits for Lost in Time adapted from Allmusic.

Performers and musicians

 Eric Benét – executive producer, horn arrangements, producer, string arrangements, vocal arrangement, vocals 
 India Benét – vocals, background vocals  
 Yetunde Bronson – choir, chorus 
 Mario Brown – choir, chorus 
 Paul Brozowski – trombone 
 Chrisette Michele – vocals 
 Timothy Cobb – string conductor 
 Ericka Collier – choir, chorus 
 Greg Collier – choir, chorus, background vocals  
 Aaron Cunningham – choir, chorus 
 Faith Evans – vocals, background vocals  
 Greg Flint – French horn 
 Sena Ford-Williams – choir, chorus 
 Michael Franceschi – trombone 
 Lisa Fuller – violin 
 Mike Giacobassi – violin 
 Jason Gillette – flute, alto flute, alto saxophone  
 Nathan Hackett – viola 
 Kathy Harris – choir, chorus 
 Denise Janae – vocals, background vocals 
 Afton Johnson – bass
 John Johnson – guitar 
 Guy Kammerer – flugelhorn, trumpet 
 Danis Kelly – harp 
 Jeanyu Kim – violin 
 Tim Klabunde – violin 
 Scott Kreger – bass 
 Kathryn Krubsack – French horn 
 Ledisi – vocals 
 Eddie Levert – vocals, background vocals 
 Laura Love – cello 
 Sascha Mandl – violin 
 John McVicker – choir, chorus, drums, background vocals  
 Brett Murphey – flugelhorn, trumpet 
 George Nash, Jr. – Fender rhodes, guitar, horn arrangements, instrumentation, keyboards, producer, soloist, string arrangements, synthesizer, vocal arrangement 
 Rafael Padilla – percussion 
 Michael Pauers – baritone saxophone
 Jeff Pietrangelo – flugelhorn, trumpet 
 Erin Pipal – viola 
 Andy Raciti – bass 
 Brek Renzelman – viola 
 Margot Schwartz – violin 
 Eric Segnitz – violin 
 Ilana Setapin – violin 
 Micah Shaw – Fender rhodes, piano, synthesizer 
 Ruslan Sirota – piano, synthesizer
 Karen Smith – violin 
 Kim Staples – choir, chorus 
 Michelle Stokes – choir, chorus 
 Peter Szczepanek – cello 
 Cornelius Tamisha – choir, chorus 
 Peter Thomas – cello 
 Olga Tuzhilkov – viola 
 Andrea Wagoner – violin 
 Warren Wiegratz – flute, tenor saxophone
 Courtney Williams – choir, chorus 
 Troy Sharon Willingham – choir, chorus 
 Benjamin Wright – horn arrangements, string arrangements 
 Adrien Zltoun – cello 

Technical

 Brian Avnet – management 
 Michael Bliesner – assistant engineer 
 Donna Caseine – publishing 
 Julia DeCiantis – booking 
 Zach Iser – booking 
 Liza Joseph – administration 
 Sean Jurewicz – assistant engineer 
 Rob Katz – assistant engineer 
 Mary March – management 
 Nabil – photography 
 Jim Reith – Pro-Tools 
 David Renzer – publishing 
 Trevor Sadler – mastering 
 Mark Siegel – booking 
 Kevin Sucher – administration, engineer, instrumentation, keyboards, mixer, production consultant, sound consultant 
 Paul Tavenner – assistant engineer 
 Steven Valenzuela – assistant engineer 
 Ellen Wakayama – creative director 
 Meg White – booking 
 Denise A. Williams – creative director 
 Shelley Wiseman – administration, management 
 Biju Zimmerman – assistant engineer

Charts

References

External links 
 

2010 albums
Eric Benét albums
Reprise Records albums